Charles Burlingame Waite (Wayne County, New York, 29 January 1824 – 1909) was a United States lawyer, jurist and author.

He was educated at Knox College, Illinois, studied law at Galesburg and Rock Island, and was admitted to the bar in 1847. After 15 years' successful practice, chiefly in Chicago, he was appointed by President Abraham Lincoln in 1862 associate justice of the Utah Supreme Court. In 1865 he resigned this post and became district attorney of Idaho, and a year later he returned to Chicago and devoted himself to literary pursuits.

In 1854 he married Catharine Van Valkenburg, also a lawyer and author and concerned in women's suffrage issues. They had eight children.

Writings

He made numerous contributions to the press on suffrage and other politico-legal questions.

Notes

References

 

1824 births
1909 deaths
American lawyers
American judges
Knox College (Illinois) alumni
19th-century American judges